Baumel is a surname. Notable people with the surname include:

Jacques Baumel (1918–2006), French politician
Jean-Marie Baumel (1912–1978), French sculptor
Judith Baumel (born 1956), American poet
Larry Baumel (born 1944), American racing driver
Laurent Baumel (born 1965), French politician
Shane Baumel (born 1997), American actor
Zechariah Baumel (1960–1982), American–Israeli soldier in the Israel Defense Forces